Pietro Rossi may refer to:

 Pietro Rossi (scientist) (1738–1804), Italian scientist and entomologist
 Pietro Rossi (sculptor) (active 1856–1882), Italian sculptor
 Pietro Rossi (chess) (1924–2020), Italian chess endgame composer
 Pietro Rossi (fictional character), An actor and lover of Lucrezia Borgia in the video game Assassin's Creed: Brotherhood
 Pietro Rossi (painting), painting by Francesco Hayez